Hyphaene petersiana, the real fan palm or makalani palm, is a palm tree native to the subtropical, low-lying regions of south central Africa.

Range and habitat
It is found in Burundi, Rwanda, the DRC, Tanzania, Angola, Mozambique, Malawi, Zambia, Zimbabwe, Botswana, Namibia and the northern and north-eastern Limpopo. Its habitat is open woodland, flood plains, banks of rivers and the fringes of pans and swamps.

Reproduction
As with other Hyphaene species, H. petersiana is dioicous and the female plants produce copious fruit of some 60 mm diameter. Up to 2,000 fruit may be found on a tree, the combined yield of about four seasons. The seeds germinate with difficulty but find saline conditions beneficial. They develop massive tap-roots which draw saline water deep underground. Though slow-growing, they may attain a maximum height of 18 metres. Typical adult plants however stand some 5 to 7 metres tall.

Uses and associations
The plants are utilised by humans and animals. Repeated cutting of the growth point to obtain sap for palm wine production may eventually destroy the trees. The stem pith is edible. Beneath the outer fibrous husk of the fruit is a core of white endosperm known as vegetable ivory, initially soft and edible and containing some liquid comparable to coconut milk. The Ovambo people call the fruit of the Makalani palm eendunga and use it to distill ombike, their traditional liquor. African palm swifts and rufous-tailed palm-thrushes regionally depend on this species for breeding.

Similar species
The species is similar to H. coriacea, which occurs to the southeast. It is however distinguishable by the shape of the fruit–round rather than pear-shaped–and the shape of the stem, which regularly bulges out below the foliage. B. aethiopum has a comparable stem shape.

See also
 Fan palm

Gallery

References

External links

 

Fruits originating in Africa
Trees of Africa
petersiana
Plants described in 1845